is a private university in Mibu, Tochigi, Japan, established in 1973.

Dokkyo University is located in the town of Mibu, in Tochigi Prefecture, about 1.5 hours north of Tokyo by train.

History
Dokkyo Medical University is a part of Dokkyo Group of Academic Institutions (Dokkyo Gakuen). Dokkyo Gakuen was established in Tokyo in 1883 as Doitsugaku Kyokai Gakko under the sponsorship of Nishi Amane, Yamagata Aritomo, and Katsura Taro. Doitsugaku Kyokai Gakko later became Dokkyo Gakuen, which was founded by Teiyu Amamo, and Minato Seki. Dokkyo Gakuen re-established junior and senior high schools in 1948. In 1964, Dokkyo Gakuen established Dokkyo University in Saitama for its 80-year anniversary. Subsequently, Dokkyo Gakuen established a medical school, Dokkyo Medical University in 1973 in Mibu, Tochigi. Its University Hospital, Saitama Medical Center, and Nikko Medical Center are now the biggest medical complex in northern area of Kanto.

Organization of Dokkyo Medical University

Undergraduate programs
School of Medicine (B.S.): Department of Medicine
School of Nursing (B.S.): Department of Nursing

Graduate program
Graduate School of Medicine (Ph.D. in Medicine)
Graduate School of Nursing (Ph.D. in Nursing)
Graduate Program of Midwifery

Hospitals
Dokkyo University Hospital
Saitama Medical Center (formerly Koshigaya Hospital)
Nikko Medical Center

Nursing Schools
Nursing School Affiliated to Dokkyo Medical University
Misato Nursing School Affiliated to Dokkyo Medical University

Student and staff numbers

Students
Graduate School of Medicine:  165

Graduate School of Nursing:    25

School of Medicine:  747

School of Nursing:   405

Graduate School of Midwifery:  10

Nursing School Affiliated to DMU:        303

Misato Nursing School Affiliated to DMU: 132

Faculty
Professors:               74
Associate professors:      88
Full-time instructors:   150

Organization of Dokkyo Gakuen
Dokkyo Medical University
Dokkyo University
Himeji Dokkyo University
Dokkyo Junior High School & Senior High School
Dokkyo Saitama Junior High School & Senior High School

External links
 Official website

References

Educational institutions established in 1973
Private universities and colleges in Japan
Universities and colleges in Tochigi Prefecture
1973 establishments in Japan
Medical schools in Japan
Mibu, Tochigi